The National Prize of Art of Chile, was created on November 9, 1942. It was awarded yearly since 1944 and alternated the mention among Painting or Sculpture, Music and Theatre. In 1992, it was replaced by the National Prizes of Plastic Arts, Musical Arts and Arts of the Representation and Audiovisual, respectively.

List of prizewinners with the National Prize of Art:

 1944 - Pablo Burchard Eggeling - Painting
 1945 - Pedro Humberto Allende - Music
 1946 - Alejandro Flores Pinaud - Theatre
 1947 - Pedro Reszka Moreau - Painting
 1948 - Enrique Soro Barriga - Music
 1949 - Rafael Frontaura de la Fuente - Theatre
 1949 - Laura Rodig - Painting
 1950 - Camilo Mori Serrano - Painting
 1951 - Domingo Santa Cruz Wilson - Music
 1952 - Pedro de la Barra - Theatre
 1953 - José Perotti Ronzoni - Sculpture
 1954 - Próspero Bisquertt Prado - Music
 1955 - Américo Vargas Vergara - Theatre
 1956 - José Caracci Vignatti - Painting
 1957 - Alfonso Leng - Music
 1958 - Jorge Quevedo Troncoso - Theatre
 1959 - Benito Rebolledo Correa - Painting
 1960 - Acario Cotapos Baeza - Music
 1961 - José Rojas Ibarra - Theatre
 1962 - Not awarded
 1963 - Not awarded
 1964 - Samuel Román Rojas - Sculpture
 1965 - Carlos Isamitt Alarcón - Music
 1966 - Pedro Sienna - Theatre
 1967 - Laureano Ladrón de Guevara - Painting
 1968 - Alfonso Letelier - Music
 1969 - Ana González - Theatre
 1970 - Marta Colvin - Sculpture
 1971 - Gustavo Becerra-Schmidt - Music
 1972 - Agustín Siré Sinobas - Music
 1973 - Not awarded
 1974 - Ana Cortés - Painting
 1975 - Not awarded
 1976 - Jorge Urrutia Blondel - Music
 1977 - Not awarded
 1978 - Pedro Mortheiru Salgado - Theatre
 1979 - Carlos Pedraza Olguín - Painting
 1980 - Víctor Tevah Tellias - Music
 1981 - Fernando Debesa Marín - Theatre
 1982 - Mario Carreño Morales - Painting
 1983 - Claudio Arrau - Music
 1984 - Ernst Uthoff Biefang - Ballet
 1985 - Israel Roa Villagra - Painting
 1986 - Federico Heinlein - Music
 1988 - Silvia Piñeiro Rodríguez - Theatre
 1990 - Roberto Matta - Painting

References

Awards established in 1942
Chilean art
Chilean music
Theatre in Chile
1942 establishments in Chile